The New Guinean long-nosed bandicoots (genus Peroryctes) are members of the order Peramelemorphia. They are small to medium-sized marsupial omnivores native to New Guinea.

Two fossil taxa from Australia, Peroryctes tedfordi and then-unnamed Silvicultor hamiltonensis, were originally assigned to this genus, but they were subsequently transferred to the separate genus Silvicultor.

References

Peramelemorphs
Marsupials of New Guinea
Mammals of Papua New Guinea
Mammals of Western New Guinea